The Rostov Regional Committee of the Communist Party of the Soviet Union, commonly referred to as the Rostov CPSU obkom, was the position of highest authority in the Rostov Oblast, in the Russian SFSR of the Soviet Union. The position was created in 1920, and abolished in August 1991. The First Secretary was a de facto appointed position usually by the Politburo or the General Secretary himself.

List of First Secretaries of the Communist Party of Rostov

See also
Rostov Oblast

Notes

References

Regional Committees of the Communist Party of the Soviet Union
Politics of Rostov Oblast
1920 establishments in Russia
1991 disestablishments in the Soviet Union